Saint-Même-le-Tenu is a former commune in the Loire-Atlantique department in western France. On 1 January 2016, it was merged into the new commune of Machecoul-Saint-Même.

Population

See also
Communes of the Loire-Atlantique department

References

Saintmemeletenu
Populated places disestablished in 2016